Maria Marfutina and Anna Morgina were the defending champions, but Morgina chose to participate at the 2017 Korea Open instead. Marfutina partners Ekaterina Yashina, but they lost in the quarterfinals to Vera Lapko and Valeria Savinykh.

Anna Blinkova and Veronika Kudermetova won the title, defeating Belinda Bencic and Michaela Hončová in the final, 6–3, 6–1.

Seeds

Draw

References
Main Draw

Neva Cup - Doubles